Tanaididae is a family of malacostracans in the order Tanaidacea. There are about 19 genera and more than 90 described species in Tanaididae.

Genera
These 19 genera belong to the family Tanaididae:

 Allotanais Shiino, 1978
 Anatanais Nordenstam, 1930
 Arctotanais Sieg, 1980
 Austrotanais Edgar, 2008
 Aviatanais Bamber, 2005
 Hexapleomera Dudich, 1931
 Langitanais Sieg, 1976
 Mekon Bamber & Boxshall, 2006
 Monoditanais Sieg, 1980
 Pancoloides Sieg, 1980
 Pancolus Richardson, 1905
 Parasinelobus Sieg, 1980
 Protanais Sieg, 1980
 Sinelobus Sieg, 1980
 Singularitanais Sieg, 1980
 Synaptotanais Sieg, 1980
 Tanais Latreille, 1831
 Zeuxo Templeton, 1840
 Zeuxoides Sieg, 1980

References

Further reading

 
 
 

Tanaidacea
Crustacean families